Bainbridge Township is one of twelve townships in Dubois County, Indiana. As of the 2010 census, its population was 16,020 and it contained 6,870 housing units. The city of Jasper, Indiana is contained within the township.

History
Bainbridge Township was originally settled chiefly by Germans.

Geography

Cities and towns
 Jasper

Unincorporated towns
 Maltersville
(This list is based on USGS data and may include former settlements.)

Adjacent townships
 Harbison Township (northeast)
 Marion Township (east)
 Jackson Township (southeast)
 Patoka Township (southwest)
 Madison Township (west)
 Boone Township (northwest)

Major highways
  U.S. Route 231
  Indiana State Road 56
  Indiana State Road 162
  Indiana State Road 164

Cemeteries
The township contains three cemeteries: Evans, McKee Ditch and Wilhoit.

References
 
 United States Census Bureau cartographic boundary files

External links
 Indiana Township Association
 United Township Association of Indiana

Townships in Dubois County, Indiana
Jasper, Indiana micropolitan area
Townships in Indiana